"That's All She Wrote" is a song by American rapper T.I. featuring fellow American rapper Eminem, released on January 11, 2011 as the eighth single from the former's seventh studio album No Mercy (2010). The song  was written by the artists and producer Dr. Luke, with co-production from Max Martin..

Background
The track was written by both T.I. and Eminem, and features two verses from each rapper. The song marks their second collaboration, with the first being "Touchdown", from T.I.'s fifth studio album T.I. vs. T.I.P. (2007). Eminem's vocals on the tracks have been called "vicious" and "exhilaratingly mean". The first and second chorus, and the first, third, and fifth verses were delivered by T.I.; while the third chorus and the second and fourth verses were delivered by Eminem; and the last chorus was delivered by both rappers.

Solo version
The solo version of this song by Eminem was released as a song off his greatest hits album, Follow the Future Presents: The Hits & Unreleased 2. It features a new verse and his verses and chorus of the original song. This track wasn't released for retail.

Critical reception
Generally, "That's All She Wrote" was well-reviewed by critics. Ken Capobianco of The Boston Globe claimed the song is one of the best tracks on No Mercy, saying it "strut[s] with the undeniable T.I. charm and bravado."  Nathan Rabin of The A.V. Club praised the song.  He thought it was the only song on No Mercy in which T.I. doesn't sound "rote and generic" and said the song "boasts a vicious, exhilaratingly mean guest turn from Eminem."

Track listing
Digital download

Charts

References

2011 singles
T.I. songs
Eminem songs
Songs written by T.I.
Songs written by Eminem
Songs written by Dr. Luke
Song recordings produced by Max Martin
Song recordings produced by Dr. Luke
Grand Hustle Records singles
Atlantic Records singles